Sarmal may refer to:
 Sarmal, Iran, a village in Bushehr Province, Iran
 Sarmal, Nashik, a village in Nashik district, Maharashtra, India
 Sarmal, Thane, a village in Thane district, Maharashtra, India